The 2020–21 Pakistan Cup was a List A cricket competition that took place in Karachi, Pakistan from 8 January to 31 January 2021. Khyber Pakhtunkhwa were the defending champions after they beat Baluchistan. However, after the new domestic structure announced by Pakistan Cricket Board (PCB), six newly formed regional teams were formed.

In December 2020, it was announced that Aaron Summers would play in the tournament, becoming the first Australian cricketer to play in a domestic cricket competition in Pakistan, after signing with Southern Punjab cricket team.

Following the conclusion of the group stage, Sindh, Khyber Pakhtunkhwa, Northern and Central Punjab had all qualified for the semi-finals of the tournament. In the first semi-final, Central Punjab beat Sindh by 127 runs. The second semi-final, between Northern and Khyber Pakhtunkhwa, ended in a tie, with Khyber Pakhtunkhwa winning the Super Over. In the final, Khyber Pakhtunkhwa beat Central Punjab by seven wickets to win the tournament. It was Khyber Pakhtunkhwa's third domestic title of the season, after they won the 2020–21 National T20 Cup and shared the 2020–21 Quaid-e-Azam Trophy with Central Punjab.

Squads
On 7 January 2021, the PCB confirmed all the squads for the tournament.

Group stage

Points

 Advanced to the semi-finals

Fixtures

Finals

References

External links
 Series home at ESPN Cricinfo

2021 in Pakistani cricket
January 2021 sports events in Pakistan
Cricket in Karachi
2020-21